Zharma is a district of Abai Region in eastern Kazakhstan. The administrative center of the district is the selo of Qalbatau (Georgiyevka). Population:

References

Districts of Kazakhstan
East Kazakhstan Region